The 12803 / 12804 Visakhapatnam Swarna Jayanti Express is a "Superfast Express" train linking Visakhapatnam and the Hazrat Nizamuddin near New Delhi, India.

The express is organized by the South Coast Railways Waltair Division. It is named for the 50th Golden Jubilee year of India's independence. The average speed of the train is 61 km per hour.

Route

The train runs twice a week. It starts from Visakhapatnam on Monday and Friday and reaches Hazrat Nizamuddin on Tuesday and Saturday, respectively. Similarly, it starts from Hazrat Nizamuddin on Sunday and Wednesday reaches Visakhapatnam on Monday and Thursday, respectively.

Train No. 12803 leaves Visakhapatnam at 08:30 hours IST (Indian Standard Time) and reaches Hazrat Nizamuddin at 17:10 hrs IST on the following day. Similarly Train No. 12804 leaves Hazrat Nizamuddin at 05:55 hrs and reaches Visakhapatnam at 17:25 hrs on the following day.

The train runs via Rajahmundry, Eluru, Vijayawada, Nagpur, Itarsi, Bhopal, Jhansi, Gwalior and Agra.

The locomotive reverses its direction at Vijayawada.

Rake sharing
This train runs with LHB coach and shares the rake with Vizag Steel Samata Express

Locomotive

This train is generally hauled by WAP-7 locomotive of Lallaguda Shed.

See also
Express trains in India

References

Transport in Visakhapatnam
Transport in Delhi
Railway services introduced in 1997
Rail transport in Uttar Pradesh
Rail transport in Madhya Pradesh
Rail transport in Andhra Pradesh
Rail transport in Telangana
Rail transport in Delhi
Rail transport in Maharashtra
Swarna Jayanti Express trains